Torrecillas de la Tiesa is a municipality located in the province of Cáceres, Extremadura, eastern Spain.

References 

Municipalities in the Province of Cáceres